Sir John Anthony Langford-Holt (30 June 1916 – 23 July 1993) was a British Conservative Member of Parliament for Shrewsbury from 1945 to 1983. Unlike most other members of Parliament, Sir John made it clear that he would never seek ministerial office and would refuse it he were offered such a post.

Biography
He was born in Studdale, Waldershare, Kent on 30 June 1916, son of Ernest and Christine Langford-Holt, and like most of his family educated at Shrewsbury School; his grandfather, George Jones Holt, had served as Mayor of Shrewsbury. During the Second World War, he served as a pilot, first in the Battle of Britain and later with the Fleet Air Arm.

During his political career, his positions included serving on the Parliamentary Science Committee, the Estimates Committee, the Expenditure Committee and the Select Committee on Defence. During Churchill's later years, he was entrusted by the Tory Whips to look after the grand old man himself. He was knighted in 1962.

He was married four times, firstly to Elisabeth Neustadtl in 1943.  The couple were divorced in 1951, and she married Major Robert Rivers-Bulkeley. In 1953, he married Flora Innes Stuart, daughter of Ian St Clair Stuart, but the marriage was dissolved in 1969, after which he married Maxine Veale in 1971. After the couple divorced in 1982, he was married for the last time to Irene Kerr. He died in London on 23 July 1993, aged 77.

References

Times Guide to the House of Commons 1979.

External links 
 

1916 births
1993 deaths
Military personnel from Kent
Conservative Party (UK) MPs for English constituencies
UK MPs 1945–1950
UK MPs 1950–1951
UK MPs 1951–1955
UK MPs 1955–1959
UK MPs 1959–1964
UK MPs 1964–1966
UK MPs 1966–1970
UK MPs 1970–1974
UK MPs 1974
UK MPs 1974–1979
UK MPs 1979–1983
People educated at Shrewsbury School
Fleet Air Arm aviators
Fleet Air Arm personnel of World War II